The 2008 African Volleyball Championship U21 was the 13th edition of the African Volleyball Championship U21. It was held in Sidi Bou Said, Tunisia from 23 August to 30 August 2010. The finalists will qualify for the 2009 Junior World Championship.

Teams

Group stage
The draw was held on 21 August.

Group A

|}

|}

Group B

|}

|}

Knockout stage

5–8th place bracket

Classification 5–8 places

|}

Seventh place match

|}

Fifth place match

|}

Championship bracket

Semifinals

|}

Bronze medal match

|}

Final

|}

Final standing

Team Roster
Bahri Ben Massoud (L), Aymen Karoui, Ibrahim Besbes, Marouane M'rabet, Skander Ben Mansour, Hamza Rezgui (C), Ismail Moalla, Ahmed Kadhi, Hamza Nagga, Rami Bennour, Elyes Karamosly, Chokri Jouini
Head Coach: Hedi Karray

Awards
MVP:  Elyes Karamosly
Best Spiker:  Mohamed Allaoui
Best Blocker:  Mamdouh Abdel Moneim
Best Server:  Chokri Jouini
Best Digger:  Sofiane Sahi
Best Setter:  Mohamed Badr
Best Receiver:  Bahri Ben Massoud

References

External links
Official website

African Volleyball Championship U21
African Volleyball Championship U21
African Volleyball Championship U21
International volleyball competitions hosted by Tunisia